Father and Son is a 2017 Vietnamese drama film directed by Lương Đình Dũng. The screenplay was written by Bùi Kim Quy and Lương Đình Dũng, based on a 1995 short story by Lương. It is selected as the Vietnamese entry for the Best Foreign Language Film at the 90th Academy Awards, but it was not nominated.

Plot
When young Ca falls ill, he and his fisherman father Moc journey to the city seeking treatment.

Cast
 Ngo The Quan
 Do Trong Tan

See also
 List of submissions to the 90th Academy Awards for Best Foreign Language Film
 List of Vietnamese submissions for the Academy Award for Best Foreign Language Film

References

External links
 

2017 films
2017 drama films
Vietnamese drama films
Vietnamese-language films